Robert McLaren (5 August 1929 – 8 October 2010) was a Scottish professional footballer who played as an inside forward. He made seven appearances in the Football League during spells with Cardiff City and Scunthorpe United.

Career
Born in Glasgow, McLaren was playing for Welsh side Barry Town when his performances prompted Football League side Cardiff City to sign him in 1950. He made his professional debut in a 0–0 draw with Luton Town in March 1950 but spent the majority of his time in the club's reserve side. He was sold back to Barry Town in January 1951 for £750 before returning to the Football League with Scunthorpe United six months later. He made six appearances before dropping back into non-league football.

References

1929 births
2010 deaths
Scottish footballers
Barry Town United F.C. players
Cardiff City F.C. players
Scunthorpe United F.C. players
English Football League players
Association football forwards
Footballers from Glasgow